Common names: Baskian viper, Iberian cross adder, Portuguese viper,Mehrtens JM (1987). Living Snakes of the World in Color. New York: Sterling Publishers. 480 pp. . Seoane's viper.

Vipera seoanei is a venomous viper species endemic to extreme southwestern France and the northern regions of Spain and Portugal. Two subspecies are currently recognized, including the nominate race described here.

Etymology
The specific name, seoanei, is in honor of Spanish naturalist Víctor López Seoane y Pardo-Montenegro.

Description

This is a highly polymorphic species for which four main color-pattern types have been described:
A: well-developed, brown zigzig pattern down the back, very much like V. berus, set against a beige or light-gray ground color.
B: roughly twin-striped pattern, with the ground color expressed as two narrow, straight, dorsolateral longitudinal lines along the body. Resembles V. kaznakovi to some degree.
C: uniform brownish morph with no pattern.
D: fragmented zigzag pattern (see V. s. cantabrica).

Geographic range
Vipera seoanei is found in extreme southwestern France and the northern regions of Spain and Portugal.

The type locality is given as "In montibus Gallaecorum et Cantabrorum...d'Espagne" (the mountains of Galicia and Cantabrici, Spain).

Mertens and Müller (1928) suggested restricting the type locality to "Cabañas, Prov. Caruña, Spanien". According to Golay et al. (1993), this is Cabañas, near Ferrol, A Coruña province, northwestern Spain.

Conservation status
This species, V. seoanei, is classified as Least Concern (LC) according to the IUCN Red List of Threatened Species (v3.1, 2001). It was given this status due to its relatively wide distribution, presumed large population, and because it is unlikely to be declining fast enough to qualify for listing in a more threatened category. Year assessed: 2005.

It is, however, listed as a protected species (Appendix III) under the Berne Convention.

Subspecies

References

Further reading

Golay P, Smith HM, Broadley DG, Dixon JR, McCarthy CJ, Rage J-C, Schätti B, Toriba M (1993). Endoglyphs and Other Major Venomous Snakes of the World: A Checklist. Geneva: Azemiops. 478 pp.
Lataste F (1879). "Diagnose d'une vipère nouvelle d'Espagne". Bulletin de la Société zoologique de France 4: 132. (Vipera berus seoanei, new subspecies). (in Latin and French).
Mertens R, Müller L (1928). "Liste der amphibien und reptilen Europes ". Abhandlungen der Senckenbergischen Naturforschenden Gesellschaft 45: 1-62. (in German).

External links

Seoane's viper, Vipera seoanei at Reptiles & Amphibians of France. Accessed 30 October 2006.

seoanei
Reptiles of Europe
Endemic fauna of the Iberian Peninsula
Reptiles described in 1879
Taxa named by Fernand Lataste